Vishwa Mangal Gou Gram Yatra (Devanagari:विश्व मंगल गौ-ग्राम यात्रा) is the largest ever cow protection movement in India. The yatra (journey) began on 30 September 2009 from Kurukshetra in Haryana and ended on 17 January 2010 at Nagpur, covering  in these 108 days. The yatra is inspired by Poojya Shri Raghaveshwara Bharathi Swamiji, the Shankaracharya of the Ramachandrapura Math in Karnataka, and has the blessings of almost all of the revered saints of the country.

Purpose
The pioneers of the yatra have set its immediate and long term purposes as follows:

Immediate purpose of the journey
 Formation of representative committee for cow protection with members from all religious sections.
 Start of safe havens for cows at tehsil and district levels.
 Demand to declare cow as the national animal.
 Demand on the central government to formulate laws to preserve various breeds of Indian cows.
 Demand for a separate ministry to handle the issues related to cows.
 Demand the state governments to take responsibility of cow protection and development activities.
 Demand to protect the purity of Indian breeds of cows by stopping cross breeding.
 Signature campaign resulting in an appeal to the President of India with crores together signatures.

Long term purpose of the journey
 Immediate action for protection and growth of the remaining 33 breeds of Indian cows.
 Take appropriate action to stop encroachment of grazing land.
 Show the path of organic farming and check farmers’ suicide.
 Stop uncontrolled migration of villagers to towns and cities.
 Educate the farmer that cow is not giver of milk alone. It is important that it is the farmers’ responsibility to care and protect the cow.
 Educate the farmer about the gains of using oxen for farming and positive effects of organic farming.
 Develop products related with cow. Create market for products from cow urine and dung.
 Conduct serious research on the above.
 Encourage agriculture related handicraft.
 Understand the divine nature of cow.
 Prosperity of villages by devotion to cow, progress of the nation from that of villages, leading to the progress of the world.

Cow slaughtering
 1760 : Robert Clive established in Calcutta the first abattoir of the country.
 1861 : Queen Victoria wrote to Viceroy of India prompting to hurt the Indian sentiments towards cows.
 1947 : At the time of independence, India had a little more than 300 abattoirs. Today there are more than 35,000 approved ones. There are thousands of unapproved slaughter houses.
 The cow-breeds have fallen from 70 to 33. Even among the remaining breeds, some are at the verge of extinction.
 Cow population has reduced by 80% after independence.
 1993-94 : India exported 1,01,668 ton beef, with a target of 2,00,000 tons for 1994-95.
 We slaughter cow for its hide to make vanity bags and belts, bone-meal for tooth paste, blood for vitamin tablets and intestines (especially of calves) for making gold and silver wafers to stick on sweets.
 17th Indian Livestock Census reports that the number of cattle in India is continuously decreasing, with 430 per 1000 humans in 1951 to 110 per 1000 humans in 2001. The estimated figure in 2011 is 20 cattle per 1000 humans. One can imagine what will be the situation of milk and milk-products if this becomes a reality.

References

Animal welfare organisations based in India
Cattle welfare organisations based in India